This article refers to the practice of taxation in Afghanistan.

Corporate taxes 
All companies, no matter what kind of legal form the company is, are required to pay a corporate tax at the rate of 20 percent. It can be found in the 4th article of the Afghan Income Tax law.

Value-added tax (VAT) 

In 2014, the parliament of Afghanistan worked closely with the International Monetary Fund to raise the domestic revenues and therefore added a value-added tax (VAT) of 10 percent. Although, the existing law does not include all goods and services (hotels are affected for example), the government is planning to broaden this tax. VAT affects both domestic business people and their trade partners. The domestic tax payer is obliged to pay the VAT on the taxable supply and the importer is obliged to pay the VAT on the taxable imports. VAT will replace the business receipts tax for all imports once implemented.

Business receipt tax (BRT) 

Afghanistan has many different tax rates of business receipt tax on their goods and services. The size of the business receipt tax depends on which kind of company and how large the company is. Lowest BRT has travel agents, culture, smaller restaurants and commodities with a tax rate of 4 percent. The larger restaurants, hotels and club halls have to pay 5 percent in business receipt tax. That tax rate was increased during 2015, from 2 percent to 4 percent, when the government wanted to increase the state revenues to finance the increased need for aid and foreign arms.

Income taxes 
Individuals are subject to tax at progressive rates, calculated monthly.

The development of the fiscal situation in Afghanistan during 21st century  
Since the beginning of the 21st century, governmental revenues have aggregately increased. One of the reasons for this improvement is a more efficient tax system. However, revenues have been less than what they planned for due to situations such as tax evasion and the large drug market, tightening constraints on the budget. In 2015, the government made some improvements of both the tax administration and the customs and that made the revenues increase during 2015.

Customs and fees 
Except from the regular taxes on income and corporations, there are a number of other different customs and fees that have increased in Afghanistan after the creation of NUG (National Unity Government), resulting in increasing revenues for the state. To begin with, there are general increases of customs fees on certain items and air space fees. There is also a tax on fuel import and a 10 percent fee on cellphone top-up cards.

The national budget and its allocation of 2018 
The national budget for 2018 consists of AFN 327 billion and represents a 17 percent decrease from that of the previous year (2017: AFN 429 billion). The Cabinet of Ministers and Mesherano Jirga voted for the budget in the end of November 2017, and the expected tax revenues for Afghanistan was by then AFN 157 billion. There is not a clear reason why the budget has decreased that much but possible explanations have been that the earlier budget was false or that the government found a way to use the development budget money more efficiently.

The government spends the most money on is security, accounting for 41 percent of the national budget. 13 percent goes to education, 11 percent to infrastructure, 9 percent to agriculture and rural development, 7 percent to governance, 7 percent to social security, 5 percent to contingency codes, 4 percent to health and 2 percent to economic governance.

References

The tax calculation of Afghanistan are as below. Currency used AFN according to Afghanistan Tax law.

Salary Tax calculation of Afghanistan.
From 0 to 5000 AFN Exempted.
From 5001 to 12500 2% Tax will be deducted,
From 12501 to 100000 10% Tax will be deducted and,
From 100000 and Above 20% Tax will be deducted or imposed

Afghanistan